The following is a summary of Down county football team's 2015 season. It was a first and last season in charge for newly appointed Down manager Jim McCorry.

Kits
McKenna Cup and National League Kits

Competitions

Dr McKenna Cup
The draw for the 2015 Dr McKenna Cup took place on 5 November 2014.

Fixtures

Table

Results

National Football League Division 2

Down played in Division Two of the National Football League in 2015. The fixtures were announced on 18 September 2014.

Fixtures

Table

Results

Ulster Senior Football Championship

The draw for the 2015 Ulster Senior Football Championship took place on 9 October 2014.

Fixtures

Bracket

Results

All-Ireland Senior Football Championship

Following defeat to Derry in the Ulster Championship quarter-finals, Down entered the All-Ireland in Round 1 of the qualifiers.

Fixtures

Notable events
 On Saturday 19 September 2014, Kilcoo manager Jim McCorry was named as the new Down boss on a three-year deal.
 On Monday 24 November 2014, former Down All Star Benny Coulter retired from inter-county football following a 15-year career.
On 20 August 2015, Jim McCorry resigned as Down manager.

References

Down
Gaelic
Down county football team seasons